Castione Andevenno is a comune (municipality) in the Province of Sondrio in the Italian region Lombardy, located about  northeast of Milan and about  west of Sondrio.

Castione Andevenno borders the following municipalities: Albosaggia, Caiolo, Postalesio, Sondrio, Torre di Santa Maria.

The 18th-century church of San Martino is found in the territory.

Demographic evolution

References

External links
 www.comune.castioneandevenno.so.it

Cities and towns in Lombardy